George Gaylen Rice (June 10, 1944 - December 26, 2010) was an American football defensive tackle who played four seasons in the American Football League (AFL) with the Houston Oilers. He was drafted by the Houston Oilers in the third round of the 1966 AFL Draft. Rice was also drafted by the Chicago Bears in the first round of the 1966 NFL Draft. He played college football at Louisiana State University and attended Istrouma High School in Baton Rouge, Louisiana.

High School career
Rice participated in football, basketball, and  track and field at Istrouma High School. He was a First-team All-State lineman in football.

College career
Rice was an All-American at Louisiana State University in 1965. He also named First-team All-SEC in 1964 and 1965. He participated in the Hula Bowl in 1966.

Professional career
Rice was drafted by the Houston Oilers with the 21st overall pick in the 1966 AFL Draft. He played with the Oilers from 1966 to 1969.

Coaching career
Rice coached at Memorial Hall School in Houston, Texas from 1971 to 1974.

He later served as an assistant coach to the defensive line on the Houston Oilers from 1975 to 1976.

References

External links
Just Sports Stats
Fanbase profile

1944 births
2010 deaths
Players of American football from Missouri
American football defensive tackles
LSU Tigers football players
Houston Oilers players
Houston Oilers coaches
People from Liberty, Missouri
Istrouma High School alumni